Kelsie Thwaites (née Wills; born 8 January 1993) is a New Zealand rugby union player. She previously represented New Zealand in Beach volleyball before switching to rugby.

Volleyball career 
Thwaites completed an indoor volleyball scholarship in the United States, and played professionally in Paris.

Thwaites and playing partner Shaunna Polley represented New Zealand at the 2018 Commonwealth Games. They were the nation's first women's beach volleyball team to compete at the Games. The pair won a bronze medal at the Ulsan Open in South Korea on the 2017 FIVB Beach Volleyball World Tour.

Rugby career 
Thwaites made a switch to rugby union in 2019. She made the Bay of Plenty Volcanix squad in her debut year for the Farah Palmer Cup. She made her international debut for the Black Ferns against England on 31 October 2021 at Exeter. She wore the black jersey for the first time in two non-test matches against the NZ Barbarians in 2020.

Thwaites was named in the Chiefs Manawa squad for the 2023 Super Rugby Aupiki season.

References

External links
Black Ferns Profile
Chiefs Manawa Profile
 
 

1993 births
Living people
New Zealand women's international rugby union players
New Zealand beach volleyball players
Women's beach volleyball players
Beach volleyball players at the 2018 Commonwealth Games
Commonwealth Games competitors for New Zealand
New Zealand female rugby union players